The Augusta Belt Railway was incorporated in 1896 and was a subsidiary of the Georgia Railroad.  It ran  of track as a switching company in Augusta, Georgia, USA, all the way through 1975, at which time it was dissolved.

Defunct Georgia (U.S. state) railroads
Railway companies established in 1896
Railway companies disestablished in 1975
Predecessors of CSX Transportation